The Voorburg Cricket Club is a cricket ground in Voorburg, Netherlands. In July 2018, it was initially selected by the Koninklijke Nederlandse Cricket Bond (KNCB) as one of the two venues to host a One Day International (ODI) cricket match between the Netherlands and Nepal, in August 2018. However, the VRA Cricket Ground was later selected to host both fixtures.

References

External links
 

Cricket grounds in the Netherlands
Sports venues in Leidschendam-Voorburg